Bird Island Airport  serves Bird Island, a small island  northwest of Victoria, the capital of the Seychelles.

The airport is served by Air Seychelles, which has chartered flights from Seychelles International Airport on Mahé. The flights are arranged by a hotel on the island.

Airlines and destinations

See also

Transport in Seychelles
List of airports in Seychelles

References

External links
OpenStreetMap - Bird Island
OurAirports - Bird Island
FallingRain - Bird Island Airport

Airports in Seychelles